Francis Hervieu, born on 13 June 1956, is a French kayaker.

Palmares
Hervieu Francis participated at the Moscow Olympics in 1980, where he finished fourth and at the Olympic Games in Los Angeles in 1984 (6th). He has even been shortlisted for the Olympics in Montreal (1976) and Seoul (1988). He participated in the World Championships (finals) : 7th in 1978, 3rd in 1979, 8th in 1982, 8th in 1983, 5th in 1985, 7th in 1986 and was a semifinalist in 1977 and 1981. Francis Hervieu also holds more than 15 France champion titles in K-1 (single-seater), K-2 (two-seater) and K-4 (four seats) between 1975 and 1987.

Profession
He was bank employee before his military service. He is currently professor of sport the Departmental Direction of Social Cohesion since 1989.

References

External links

People from Saint-Lô
1956 births
Canoeists at the 1980 Summer Olympics
Canoeists at the 1984 Summer Olympics
French male canoeists
Living people
Olympic canoeists of France
ICF Canoe Sprint World Championships medalists in kayak
Kayakers
Sportspeople from Manche